Rodney Lynn Temperton (9 October 1949 – 25 September 2016) was an English songwriter, producer and musician.  

Temperton was the keyboardist and main songwriter for the 1970s pop music, disco and funk band Heatwave, writing songs including "Star of a Story", "Always and Forever", "Boogie Nights", and "The Groove Line". After he was recruited by record producer Quincy Jones, he wrote several successful singles for Michael Jackson, including "Thriller", "Off the Wall", and "Rock with You". He also wrote songs for George Benson, including "Give Me the Night" and "Love X Love", along with Patti Austin and James Ingram's United States number-one single "Baby, Come to Me", among many others.

Temperton wrote the soundtrack for the 1986 film Running Scared. In 1990 he won a Grammy Award for Best Arrangement, Instrumental or A Cappella for Birdland.

Biography

Early years
Rodney Lynn Temperton was born in Cleethorpes, Lincolnshire, on 9 October 1949. Interviewed for the BBC Radio 2 documentary The Invisible Man: the Rod Temperton Story, Temperton said that he was a musician from an early age: "My father wasn't the kind of person who would read you a story before you went off to sleep. He used to put a transistor radio in the crib, right on the pillow, and I'd go to sleep listening to Radio Luxembourg, and I think that had an influence."

Temperton attended De Aston Grammar School, Market Rasen, Lincolnshire, and he formed a group for the school's music competitions. He was a drummer at this time. "I'd get in the living room with my snare drum and my cymbal and play along to the BBC test card, which was all kinds of music they'd be playing continuously." On leaving school, he started working as a fish filleter for Ross Frozen Foods in Grimsby, Lincolnshire.

Heatwave
Temperton soon became a full-time musician as a keyboard player, and played in several dance bands. This took him to Worms in Germany. In 1974, he answered an advert in Melody Maker for a keyboardist, placed by Johnnie Wilder Jr., and as a result, became a member of the pop, disco, and funk band: Heatwave, which Wilder was putting together at the time. "He was the first British guy that I had ever met personally. He spoke kind of funny but he had a good sense of humour and he was a very friendly guy. After meeting him and then seeing him play I kind of determined he was a good enough player and entertainer and I just knew he would fit in the group", said Wilder. Temperton played Wilder tunes he had been composing: "I was very interested because we were doing a lot of cover tunes – we weren't doing a lot of original material – I was really interested." The songs provided material for 1976's Too Hot to Handle including "Boogie Nights", which broke the band in the United Kingdom and the United States, and the ballad "Always and Forever"; both tracks were million-sellers in the USA.

Despite the slick American sound, Temperton's working surroundings were still far from glamorous. Alan Kirk, a Yorkshire musician with Jimmy James and the Vagabonds, who toured with Heatwave in the mid 1970s, remembered: "The Always and Forever track was written on a Wurlitzer piano at the side of a pile of pungent washing – sorry to disappoint all the romantics". And producer Barry Blue recalled: "He had a very small flat, so everything had to be done within one room and he had piles of washing, and had the T.V. on top of the organ. It was a nightmare [...] he had trams running outside [...] but he made it, he just absorbed himself in the music and Rod seemed to come up with these amazing songs." In 1977, Heatwave followed up the success of its first album with its second, Central Heating, with Barry Blue again producing, and Temperton behind the majority of the songs. It included "The Groove Line", another international hit single. In 1978, Temperton decided to concentrate on writing, and left Heatwave, though he continued to write for the band.

Songs written for Michael Jackson
Rod Temperton's work attracted the attention of Quincy Jones, and he asked his engineer Bruce Swedien to check out the Heatwave album. "Holy cow! I simply loved Rod's musical feeling – everything about it – Rod's arrangements, his tunes, his songs – was exceedingly hip", recalled Swedien, also calling Temperton: "the most disciplined pop music composer I've ever met. When he comes to the studio, every musical detail is written down or accounted for in Rod's mind. He never stops until he feels confident that the music we're working on is able to stand on its own." In 1979, Temperton was recruited by Quincy Jones to write for what became Michael Jackson's first solo album in four years, and his first full-fledged solo release for Epic Records, titled Off the Wall. Temperton wrote three songs for the album, including "Rock with You", which became the second US number 1 single from the album.

In the early 1980s, Temperton left Germany and moved to Beverly Hills, California. In 1982, Temperton wrote three songs, including the title track, for Jackson's next LP, Thriller, which became the biggest-selling album of all time in the United States, selling 32 million copies. Temperton also wrote the spoken word section of the song for the actor Vincent Price. On coming up with the title "Thriller", Temperton once said:

Other songwriting successes
Temperton wrote successfully for other musicians, his hits including disco classic "Stomp!" for The Brothers Johnson; George Benson's "Give Me the Night"; "Baby, Come to Me" for Patti Austin and James Ingram; "Love Is in Control (Finger on the Trigger)" for Donna Summer; and "Yah Mo B There" for James Ingram and Michael McDonald. He also wrote for Herbie Hancock, The Manhattan Transfer, Mica Paris, Rufus and Chaka Khan, and many others.

Film work
In 1979, Temperton co-wrote the song, Keep Tomorrow For Me, with Barry Blue.  The song was performed by Heatwave for the movie Escape To Athena soundtrack. The song served as the movie's closing theme. 

In 1982, Temperton wrote the music to Someone in the Dark, recorded by Michael Jackson, and produced by Quincy Jones, for the movie E.T. the Extra-Terrestrial, with lyrics by Alan and Marilyn Bergman.

In 1986, Temperton was nominated for the Academy Award for Best Original Song for "Miss Celie's Blues (Sister)", which he wrote with Quincy Jones and Lionel Richie for The Color Purple film of 1985. (Richie won the award for "Say You, Say Me", from White Nights.) He was also nominated for Best Original Score, along with the 11 other composers, including Jones, who worked on The Color Purple's soundtrack.

Later in 1986, the buddy-cop action-comedy Running Scared was released, featuring five new songs written by Temperton, including "Sweet Freedom", performed by Michael McDonald; and "Man Size Love", performed by Klymaxx. Temperton also composed the film's score.

Personal life and death
After leaving Heatwave to concentrate on his songwriting, Rod Temperton shunned the celebrity lifestyle, and remained a very private man. Due to his low profile, Temperton was nicknamed 'The Invisible Man'. He died on 25 September 2016 after "a brief aggressive battle with cancer", as quoted by Jon Platt of Warner/Chappell music publishing. His death would be announced a week later on 5 October 2016, with his private funeral having already taken place. Gilles Peterson, a BBC radio presenter, paid tribute to Temperton on Twitter: "Apart from Lennon and McCartney no one from the UK has written more gold plated songs than Sir Rod Temperton... a huge loss. RIP".

Temperton is survived by his wife Kathy. They had homes in Los Angeles, the south of France, Fiji, Switzerland, and Kent in southeast England.

Songwriting credits

Production credits
The Running Scared soundtrack album, 1986 (with Dick Rudolph and Bruce Swedien)
"We Belong to Love" by Jeffrey Osborne, from Emotional, 1986
Kiss of Life by Siedah Garrett, 1988 (with Dick Rudolph)
Back on the Block by Quincy Jones, 1989 (associate producer)
"Givin' In to Love" by Patti Austin, from Carry On, 1991
"You Put a Move on My Heart", "We Were Made for Love", "Two in a Million", and "Love Keeps Coming Back" by Mica Paris, from Whisper a Prayer, 1993
"We Are the Future", from We Are the Future: You Are the Answer, 2004 (with Sunny Levine)

Arranging
Back on the Block, with Andrae Crouch, Quincy Jones, Quincy Jones III, and Bill Summers; Wee B. Dooinit, with Siedah Garrett, Jones, Mark Kibble, and Ian Prince; Birdland (winner of the 1991 Grammy Award for Best Instrumental Arrangement), with Jerry Hey, Jones, and Prince; Tomorrow (A Better You, Better Me), with Hey and Jones; The Secret Garden, with Garrett, Hey, and Jones, from Back on the Block, 1989
You Put a Move on My Heart, with John Clayton; Rock with You, with Jones, Jones III, and Greg Phillinganes; Stomp, with Hey and Jones; Heaven's Girl, with Hey, Jones, and R. Kelly; and Slow Jams, with Clayton, Hey, and Phillinganes, from Q's Jook Joint, 1995
Lovelines and My Body Keeps Changing My Mind, from solo album by Karen Carpenter recorded in 1979-1980, released in 1996.

References

External links

Six Million Steps – Rod Temperton Special radio show from March 2008
Six Million Steps – Rod Temperton Special REMIXED radio show from October 2016
Irreverent website info
"The Yorkshire Post" article (2006)
https://web.Archive.org/web/20161011152450/https://www.Death-Notices.co.uk/obituaries-celebrities-death/128/Rod-Temperton-Songwriting-Giant-Behind-Thriller-And-Off-The-Wall-Dies

1949 births
2016 deaths
English pop pianists
English pop singers
English songwriters
English record producers
English rhythm and blues musicians
British disco musicians
English soul musicians
People from Cleethorpes
Grammy Award winners
English keyboardists
English funk musicians
Heatwave (band) members
English expatriates in the United States
Deaths from cancer in England
English expatriates in Germany
People educated at De Aston School
Musicians from Lincolnshire